Kilfian GAA  is a Gaelic football club in northern County Mayo.

References

Gaelic football clubs in County Mayo
Gaelic games clubs in County Mayo